February 28 - Eastern Orthodox liturgical calendar - March 1
(On non-leap years, the commemorations below are celebrated on February 28.)

All fixed commemorations below are observed on March 13 by Eastern Orthodox Churches on the Old Calendar.

For February 29th, Orthodox Churches on the Old Calendar commemorate the Saints listed on February 16.

Saints

 Saint Leo of Cappadocia, monastic.
 Venerable John Cassian the Roman, Abbot of Monastery of St Victor, Marseille (435)
 Venerable Germanus of Dacia Pontica (Dobrogea, Romania) (c. 415)
 Venerable John, called Barsanuphius, of Nitria in Egypt (5th century)
 Saint George the Confessor, Bishop of Defeltos (7th century) 
 Martyr Theocteristus, Abbot of Pelekete monastery near Prusa (8th century)

Pre-Schism Western saints

 Saint Oswald of Worcester, Archbishop of York (992)

Post-Schism Orthodox saints

 Venerable Cassian, recluse and faster of the Kiev Caves (12th century)
 Saint Cassian of Mu Lake (Muezersk) Hermitage, disciple of St. Alexander of Svir (16th century)
 Saint Arsenius (Matseyevich), Archbishop of Rostov (1772)
 Saint Meletius, Archbishop of Kharkov and Akhtyr (1840) (see also: February 12)

Other commemorations

 "Devpeteruv" Icon of the Mother of God (1392)

Icon gallery

Notes

References

Sources
 February 29 / March 13. Orthodox Calendar (Pravoslavie.ru).
 March 13 / February 29. Holy Trinity Russian Orthodox Church (A parish of the Patriarchate of Moscow).
 February 29. OCA - The Lives of the Saints.
 The Autonomous Orthodox Metropolia of Western Europe and the Americas. St. Hilarion Calendar of Saints for the year of our Lord 2004. St. Hilarion Press (Austin, TX). p. 18.
 The Twenty-Ninth Day of the Month of February. Orthodoxy in China.
Greek Sources
  Συναξαριστής. 29 Φεβρουαρίου. Ecclesia.gr. (H Εκκλησια Τησ Ελλαδοσ). 
Russian Sources
  16 февраля (ст.ст.) 29 февраля 2012 (нов. ст.). Русская Православная Церковь Отдел внешних церковных связей.

February in the Eastern Orthodox calendar